The Viking Watch of the Danish Seaman is a 1948 Danish war drama directed by Bodil Ipsen and Lau Lauritzen Jr. The film, known alternatively as Perilous Expedition or its literal title translation Steady stands the Danish sailor, written by Grete Frische based upon the wartime diary of Kaj Frische, tells the true story of Danish sailors who sailed with the Allied forces during the German occupation of Denmark in World War II. It stars Poul Reichhardt and Lisbeth Movin. The film received the Bodil Award for Best Danish Film in 1949.

Cast

References

External links 
 
 
 

1940s war drama films
1948 drama films
1948 films
Best Danish Film Bodil Award winners
Danish black-and-white films
Danish war drama films
1940s Danish-language films
Films directed by Bodil Ipsen
Films directed by Lau Lauritzen Jr.
Films scored by Sven Gyldmark
Seafaring films
Danish World War II films
Films about Danish resistance movement